Roddick Murdoch Steel (28 December 1928 – 11 March 2009) was an Australian fencer. He competed in the team foil event at the 1956 Summer Olympics.

References

1928 births
2009 deaths
Australian male fencers
Olympic fencers of Australia
Fencers at the 1956 Summer Olympics
Commonwealth Games medallists in fencing
Commonwealth Games silver medallists for Australia
Commonwealth Games bronze medallists for Australia
Fencers at the 1954 British Empire and Commonwealth Games
Medallists at the 1954 British Empire and Commonwealth Games